Marvar is a village in Bafruiyeh Rural District, in the Central District of Meybod County, Yazd Province, Iran. At the 2006 census, its population was 19, in 9 families.

References 

Populated places in Meybod County